The 49ers–Packers rivalry is an American football rivalry between the San Francisco 49ers and the Green Bay Packers. The two teams do not play every year; instead, they play once every three years due to the NFL's rotating division schedules, or if the two teams finish in the same place in their respective divisions, they would play the ensuing season. The rivalry became prominent during the 1990s, as the Brett Favre-led Packers defeated the Steve Young-led 49ers in three of four playoff meetings. In the 2005 NFL Draft, the 49ers selected Alex Smith with the first overall selection, passing on northern California native Aaron Rodgers; Green Bay later selected Rodgers with the 24th pick.  Since Rodgers became the Packers' starter in 2008, the Packers and 49ers met in the playoffs four times, though the 49ers won all four of these meetings.

The Packers lead the all-time series 38–33–1. The teams have met nine times in the playoffs, with the 49ers leading 5–4.

History
The 49ers and Packers emerged as rivals during the mid-1990s, playing in four consecutive playoff games. During this period, the 49ers were led by Steve Young and Jerry Rice, while the Packers featured Brett Favre as its offensive leader, and Reggie White as its defensive anchor. The two teams' head coaches came from the Bill Walsh coaching tree, with 49ers head coach George Seifert having served under Walsh as a defensive coordinator, and Packers head coach Mike Holmgren having served as an offensive coordinator and quarterbacks coach. Both were on Walsh's staff when the 49ers won Super Bowl XXIII in 1988, and Holmgren served on Seifert's staff when the 49ers repeated as champions in Super Bowl XXIV following the 1989 season. Before the 1992 season, Holmgren was hired as the Packers' head coach, and acquired Favre from the Atlanta Falcons.

Their first postseason encounter came in the 1995 Divisional Round. The 49ers entered the game as defending Super Bowl champions. In that game, the Packers jumped out to a 21–0 lead en route to a 27–17 victory at Candlestick Park. While Favre threw for 299 yards and two touchdowns, Young completed 32 of a record 65 pass attempts for 328 yards, with two interceptions and three sacks. The two teams met again in the 1996 Divisional Round, with Green Bay also winning the game 35–14 en route to claiming Super Bowl XXXI. This game was notorious for muddy conditions at Lambeau Field following a torrent of rain and snow. In a defensive battle, it was special teams player and eventual Super Bowl MVP Desmond Howard who stole the show, with a 71-yard punt return touchdown and a 46-yard return to set up another Packers touchdown. After this game, Seifert left the 49ers, and former Packers assistant Steve Mariucci took over as head coach.

Muddy field conditions and torrential rain also played a key role when the 49ers and Packers met for a third straight postseason in the 1997 NFC Championship Game at Candlestick Park. This game, which the Packers won 23–10 en route to a losing effort in Super Bowl XXXII, saw Favre complete a touchdown pass to Antonio Freeman in the second quarter to give the Packers a lead they never relinquished. But perhaps the most defining moment of the rivalry came in the 1998 Wild Card Round. Late in the fourth quarter, with the 49ers trailing 27–23, Young drove 76 yards to set up Terrell Owens' game-winning touchdown catch. This moment became known as The Catch II, in homage to a similar play in the 1981 NFC Championship Game. This was also the only time Young defeated Favre in the playoffs, and was also Favre's only career loss to San Francisco.

The final playoff meeting involving Brett Favre came in the 2001 Wild Card Round. With the Packers trailing at home 7–6 entering the second half, Favre completed 16 of 21 passes for 226 yards, and led the Packers to four scoring drives. The last of those drives saw Ahman Green run nine yards for the game-sealing touchdown.

The rivalry between the two teams reignited during the 2005 NFL Draft. After the 49ers finished 2–14 in the 2004 season, they received the top overall pick in the draft. This draft featured two top quarterback prospects in Alex Smith and northern California native Aaron Rodgers, who grew up rooting for the 49ers and idolizing Joe Montana. In an infamous draft moment, the 49ers passed on Rodgers and selected Smith with the first pick. Meanwhile, Rodgers had to wait until the Packers selected him with the 24th overall pick. While Smith immediately became the starter for the 49ers, Rodgers backed up Favre for three seasons before becoming the Packers' starting quarterback in 2008. Between 2008 and 2012, Rodgers defeated Smith in two of three regular season encounters, before Smith was eventually traded to the Kansas City Chiefs in 2013.

During the Brett Favre era, the Packers dominated the 49ers, with Favre having an 11–1 record against them (with the only loss being the aforementioned 1998 Wild Card game). Since the Aaron Rodgers era began, however, the 49ers have had more success against the Packers, as Rodgers is 6–7 all-time against the 49ers (including an 0–4 playoff record). This is stark contrast with the Cowboys–Packers rivalry, where Favre went 2–9 against Dallas while Rodgers sports an 8–2 record against Dallas.

The 49ers and Packers renewed their playoff rivalry in the 2012 Divisional Round. This game saw the playoff debut of Colin Kaepernick, and he rewarded the home fans with a quarterback playoff record 181 rushing yards, 263 passing yards and four touchdowns. This marked the final playoff game at Candlestick Park. The following season, a rematch took place in Green Bay during the 2013 Wild Card Round. Despite the chilly conditions at Lambeau Field, the 49ers prevailed in a close-knit affair 23–20, with Phil Dawson scoring the game-winning field goal. Kaepernick ran for 98 yards and threw 227 yards. This was San Francisco's first playoff road victory over Green Bay. The 49ers and Packers also faced off in the 2019 NFC Championship Game, with running back Raheem Mostert scoring four touchdowns on 220 rushing yards. This game also featured two coaches who were fourth-generation descendants to the Bill Walsh coaching tree, as 49ers head coach Kyle Shanahan and Packers head coach Matt LaFleur both served under Kyle's father Mike Shanahan, who in turn succeeded Mike Holmgren as the 49ers' offensive coordinator under George Seifert.

Two years after the 2019 NFC Championship, the two teams met again in the 2021 Divisional Round. While the Packers entered the contest as the NFC's top seed, the sixth-seeded 49ers bested the Packers in a low-scoring contest, 13–10. The game's turning point saw the 49ers' special teams score a game-tying touchdown late in the fourth quarter following a blocked punt on Packers punter Corey Bojorquez, and in the closing seconds, placekicker Robbie Gould kicked the game-winning field goal. This dropped Rodgers' playoff record against the 49ers to 0–4.

Game results

|-
| 
| Tie 1–1
| style="| Packers  25–21
| style="| 49ers   30–14
| Tied  1–1
| First meetings at City Stadium and Kezar Stadium.
|-
| 
| style="| 
| 
| style="| 49ers   31–19
| 49ers  2–1
|
|-
| 
| style="| 
| 
| style="| 49ers   24–14
| 49ers  3–1
|
|-
| 
| style="| 
| style="| 49ers   37–7
| style="| 49ers   48–14
| 49ers  5–1
| First meeting at Milwaukee County Stadium.
|-
| 
| style="| 
| style="| 49ers   23–17
| style="| 49ers   35–0
| 49ers  7–1
|
|-
| 
| style="| 
| style="| Packers  27–21
| style="| Packers  28–7
| 49ers  7–3
|
|-
| 
| style="| 
| style="| 49ers   17–16
| style="| 49ers   38–20
| 49ers  9–3
| First start in the series for Bart Starr. Final meeting at City Stadium.
|-
| 
| style="| 
| style="| 49ers   24–14
| style="| 49ers   27–20
| 49ers  11–3
|
|-
| 
| style="| 
| style="| 49ers   33–12
| style="| 49ers   48–21
| 49ers  13–3
|
|-
| 
| style="| 
| style="| Packers  21–20
| style="| Packers  36–14
| 49ers  13–5
| First meeting at Lambeau Field (then called New City Stadium).
|-

|-
| 
| style="| 
| style="| Packers  41–14
| style="| Packers  13–0
| 49ers  13–7
| Packers lose 1960 NFL Championship.
|-
| 
| Tie 1–1
| style="| Packers  30–10
| style="| 49ers   22–21
| 49ers  14–8
| Packers win 1961 NFL Championship.
|-
| 
| style="| 
| style="| Packers  31–13
| style="| Packers  31–21
| 49ers  14–10
| Packers win 1962 NFL Championship. 
|
|-
| 
| style="| 
| style="| Packers  28–10
| style="| Packers  21–17
| 49ers  14–12
|
|-
| 
| Tie 1–1
| style="| Packers  24–14
| style="| 49ers   24–14
| 49ers  15–13
|
|-
| 
| style="| 
| style="| Packers  27–10
| Tie   24–24
| 49ers  15–14–1
| Packers win 1965 NFL Championship.
|
|-
| 
| Tie 1–1
| style="| Packers  20–7
| style="| 49ers   21–20
| 49ers  16–15–1
| Packers win 1966 NFL Championship and Super Bowl I.
|-
| 
| style="| 
| style="| Packers  13–0
|
| Tied  16–16–1
| Packers win 1967 NFL Championship and Super Bowl II.
|-
| 
| style="| 
| 
| style="| 49ers   27–20
| 49ers  17–16–1
|
|-
| 
| style="| 
| style="| Packers  14–7
|
| Tied  17–17–1
|
|-

|-
| 
| style="| 49ers   26–10
| Kezar Stadium
| 49ers  18–17–1
| Final start in the series for Bart Starr.
|-
| 
| style="| Packers  34–24
| Milwaukee County Stadium
| Tied  18–18–1
|
|-
| 
| style="| 49ers   20–6
| Candlestick Park
| 49ers  19–18–1
| First meeting at Candlestick Park.
|-
| 
| style="| 49ers   7–6
| Candlestick Park
| 49ers  20–18–1
|
|-
| 
| style="| 49ers   26–14
| Lambeau Field
| 49ers  21–18–1
|
|-
| 
| style="| Packers  16–14
| Milwaukee County Stadium
| 49ers  21–19–1
|
|-

|-
| 
| style="| Packers  23–16
| Milwaukee County Stadium
| 49ers  21–20–1
| 
|-
| 
| style="| 49ers  13–3
| Milwaukee County Stadium
| 49ers  22–20–1
| First start in the series for Joe Montana. 49ers win Super Bowl XVI.
|-
| 
| style="| 49ers  31–17
| Milwaukee County Stadium
| 49ers  23–20–1
| Last meeting at Milwaukee County Stadium.
|-
| 
| style="| 49ers  23–12
| Lambeau Field
| 49ers  24–20–1
|
|-
| 
| style="| Packers  21–17
| Candlestick Park
| 49ers  24–21–1
| 49ers win Super Bowl XXIV.
|-

|-
| 
| style="| 49ers  24–20
| Lambeau Field
| 49ers  25–21–1
| Final start in the series for Joe Montana.
|-
! 1995 playoffs
! style="| Packers  27–17
! Candlestick Park
! 49ers  25–22–1
! NFC Divisional Round. First start in the series for Brett Favre and Steve Young.
|-
| 
| style="| Packers  
| Lambeau Field
| 49ers  25–23–1
|  Packers win Super Bowl XXXI.
|- 
! 1996 playoffs
! style="| Packers  35–14
! Lambeau Field
! 49ers  25–24–1
! NFC Divisional Round
|-
! 1997 playoffs
! style="| Packers  23–10
! 3Com Park
! Tied  25–25–1
! NFC Championship Game. Packers lose Super Bowl XXXII.
|-
| 
| style="| Packers  36–22
| Lambeau Field
| Packers  26–25–1
| Packers lead in the series for the first time since 1950.
|-
! 1998 playoffs
! style="| 49ers  30–27
! 3Com Park
! Tied  26–26–1
! NFC Wild Card Round. Game known as The Catch II, featuring a game-winning touchdown catch by Terrell Owens. Final start in the series for Steve Young.
|-
| 
| style="| Packers  20–3
| 3Com Park
| Packers  27–26–1
| 
|-

|-
| 
| style="| Packers  31–28
| Lambeau Field
| Packers  28–26–1
|
|-
! 2001 playoffs
! style="| Packers  25–15
! Lambeau Field
! Packers  29–26–1
! NFC Wild Card Round. As of 2022, Most recent playoff win in the series for Green Bay
|-
| 
| style="| Packers  20–14
| 3Com Park
| Packers  30–26–1
| 
|-
| 
| style="| Packers  20–10
| Lambeau Field
| Packers  31–26–1
| 
|-
| 
| style="| Packers  30–19
| Monster Park
| Packers  32–26–1
| Final start in the series for Brett Favre.
|-
| 
| style="| Packers  30–24
| Lambeau Field
| Packers  33–26–1
| First start in the series for Aaron Rodgers.
|-

|-
| 
| style="| Packers  34–16
| Lambeau Field
| Packers  34–26–1
| Packers win Super Bowl XLV.
|-
| 
| style="| 49ers  30–22
| Lambeau Field
| Packers  34–27–1
| 49ers lose Super Bowl XLVII.
|-
! 2012 playoffs
! style="| 49ers  45–31
! Candlestick Park
! Packers  34–28–1
! NFC Divisional Round.
|-
| 
| style="| 49ers  34–28
| Candlestick Park
| Packers  34–29–1
| 
|-
! 2013 playoffs
! style="| 49ers  23–20
! Lambeau Field
! Packers  34–30–1
! NFC Wild Card Round.
|-
| 
| style="| Packers  17–3
| Levi's Stadium
| Packers  35–30–1
| First meeting at Levi's Stadium.
|-
| 
| style="| Packers  33–30
| Lambeau Field
| Packers  36–30–1
| 
|-
| 
| style="| 49ers  37–8
| Levi's Stadium
| Packers  36–31–1
| 49ers lose Super Bowl LIV
|-
! 2019 playoffs
! style="| 49ers  37–20
! Levi's Stadium
! Packers  36–32–1
! NFC Championship Game
|-

|-
| 
| style="| Packers  34–17
| Levi's Stadium
| Packers  37–32–1
| No fans in attendance for game due to COVID-19 pandemic.
|-
| 
| style="| Packers  30–28
| Levi's Stadium
| Packers  38–32–1
| 
|-
! 2021 playoffs
! style="| 49ers 13–10
! Lambeau Field
! Packers  38–33–1
! NFC Divisional Round. Ninth postseason meeting, ties NFL record.
|-

|-
| Regular season
| style="|
| Packers 22–11
| 49ers 17–12–1
| The "at Green Bay Packers" column includes twelve games played in Milwaukee, in which the Packers were 9–3.
|-
| Postseason
| style="|
| Tied 2–2
| 49ers 3–2
| NFC Wild Card playoffs: 1998, 2001, 2013. NFC Divisional playoffs: 1995, 1996, 2012, 2021. NFC Championship Game: 1997, 2019.
|-
| Regular and postseason 
| style="|
| Packers 24–13
| 49ers 20–14–1
| 
|-

Club success

See also

National Football League rivalries

Notes

References

National Football League rivalries
San Francisco 49ers
Green Bay Packers rivalries
San Francisco 49ers rivalries